The Egypt Arab Socialist Party is a political party in Egypt.

History and profile
The party was established in 1976 and its head was Mamdouh Salem. He served as the prime minister of Egypt from 1975 to 1978.

The party generally presses for preserving gains of the Egyptian Revolution of 1952.

The party nominated its head, Wahid Al-Uksory, to run for Egypt's first multi-candidate presidential election in 2005. It was part of the Democratic Alliance for Egypt during the 2011–12 parliamentary election.

References

External links

Facebook page

1976 establishments in Egypt
Arab nationalism in Egypt
Arab socialist political parties
Islamic political parties in Egypt
Islamic socialist political parties
Nationalist parties in Egypt
Political parties established in 1976
Religion and politics
Socialist parties in Egypt